Egor Gerasimov was the defending champion but lost in the second round to Jurij Rodionov.

Sebastian Ofner won the title after defeating Daniel Brands 7–6(7–5), 6–3 in the final.

Seeds

Draw

Finals

Top half

Bottom half

References
Main Draw
Qualifying Draw

President's Cup - Men's Singles
President's Cup (tennis)